The Southwest Conference is a Nebraska School Activities Association-sponsored league with 8 members across the state of Nebraska.

Members

References 

Nebraska high school sports conferences
Sports in Nebraska